The National Police of Colombia is the national police force of the Republic of Colombia. Although the National Police is not part of the Military Forces of Colombia (Army, Navy, and Air Force), it constitutes along with them the "Public Force" and is also controlled by the Ministry of Defense. The National Police is the only civilian police force in Colombia. The force's official functions are to protect the Colombian nation, enforce the law by constitutional mandate, maintain and guarantee the necessary conditions for public freedoms and rights and to ensure peaceful cohabitation among the population.

History

Creation in the 19th century
During the second half of the 19th century Colombia went through many political changes and struggles to define itself as a nation. Tensions between the two main political parties, the Colombian Liberal Party and the Colombian Conservative Party, escalated to numerous civil wars trying to establish a political system between federalism or centralism and other major differences.

The National Police of Colombia was established by Law 90 of 1888 to be under government orders and as a dependency of the then Ministry of Government intended to function as a gendarmerie for Bogotá.

The new institution was planned to be a force of 300 gendarmes divided into three companies; commanded by a captain, two lieutenants and a second lieutenant, all commanded by two high-ranking officers.

On October 23, 1890, acting president Carlos Holguín Mallarino sanctioned into law the authorization to hire any qualified trainers from either the United States or Europe to organize and train the newly established National Police. The Colombian officials selected a French commissioner named Jean Marie Marcelin Gilibert. The institution was formally established by decree 1000 of November 5, 1891.

The initial mission of the National Police was to preserve public tranquility, protecting people and public and private properties. By constitutional law the institution had to enforce and guarantee the rights of the people, the constitution and its laws, and obey their authority. Its function also included the authority to take action to prevent crimes and prosecute and arrest law-breakers. The National Police was intended to recognize no privileges or distinctions among the general population. The only exception was for international treaties established in the Constitution that gave immunity to members of diplomatic missions.

After a civil war broke out in 1895 during the presidency of Rafael Núñez, the president went absent and Miguel Antonio Caro took over office temporarily. Caro declared a general state of emergency in which authority over the National Police was transferred to the Ministry of War on January 21, 1896, and its members received the same privileges as military personnel.

When aged president Manuel Antonio Sanclemente was replaced by Vice-president José Manuel Marroquín, who assumed the presidency, the National Police was restructured and organized in a military manner. It was then transferred back to the Ministry of Government. To guarantee the security of Bogotá, the National Police was divided into seven districts to cover the entire city. A mutual fund called Caja de Gratificaciones was set up to pay benefits to service members, financed by the penalties imposed to the civilian population. By 1899 the National Police had a force of 944 agents divided into eight divisions.

20th century

When the most intense of the civil wars broke out, known as the Thousand Days' War (1899–1902), the National Police was once again assigned to the Ministry of War until September 6, 1901. Under the Decree 1380 of September 16, 1902 the National Police created the Presidential Palace Honor Guard Corps with the name Guardia Civil de la Ciudad de Bogotá (Civil Guard of the City of Bogotá).

During the presidency of Rafael Reyes, the government authorized by decree 743 of 1904, the transfer of the Police to the Ministry of War, with the president micro-managing the institution. By authorization of Law 43 the Judicial Commissary of Police was established under the dependency of the General Command of the National Police to investigate crimes within its jurisdiction.

From 1906 to 1909 the government created a cloned institution with similar functions to the National Police named the National Gendarmerie Corps (Cuerpo de Gendarmeria Nacional) intended to function decentralized from the National Police command and more militarized regime, managed by the Ministry of War. When General Jorge Holguín suppressed the National Gendarmerie Corps, the province governors were given the authority to organize police services at their own will.

Law 14 signed on November 4, 1915 defined the National Police functions to "preserve public tranquility in Bogotá and any other place where needed to execute its functions, protect citizens and aid the constitutional law by enforcing it and the judicial branch of government." The institution was divided into three groups; the first in charge of security and vigilante functions, a second group acting as civil gendarmerie guard whose main responsibility was protecting the postal service and controlling the prison system. The third group functioned as the judicial police.

In 1916 the institution was trained by the Spanish Guardia Civil in their doctrine, mainly related to criminology. They were restructured by Decree 1628 of October 9 of 1918, assigning the direction, sub-direction and Inspector General duties to officers seconded from the National Army of Colombia - thus the basis for the Prussian style dress uniforms used today. Later the same year, as authorized by a Law 74 of November 19, 1919, the Colombian president hired a French instructor and chief of detectives, who was an expert in the anthropometric system to train the National Police.

In 1924 the Criminal Investigation School was founded to update personnel working in this area. In 1929 the Colombian government in agreement with the Argentine government, hired Enrique Medina Artola to train the Colombian Police in dactylography to replace the anthropometric system. In 1934 in an agreement with the Spanish government the National Police was trained in scientific identification until 1948.

On July 7, 1937 by Decree 1277, the government authorized the creation of the General Santander Academy, which began operating in 1940 as an institute for every police recruit in the force. In 1939 the Colombian government receives the first cooperation agreement with the United States, through a Federal Bureau of Investigation (FBI) committee headed by agent Edgar K. Thompson.

El Bogotazo and La Violencia

In 1948 when the civil unrest known as "El Bogotazo" broke out, after the assassination of the popular presidential candidate Jorge Eliecer Gaitán, the stability of the country was abruptly interrupted. This generated a period of civil unrest known as La Violencia, which lasted for almost a decade. The government then decided to restructure the institution once again, with the cooperation and advice from the British. The English mission was composed of Colonel Douglas Gordon, Colonel Eric M. Roger, Lieutenant Colonel Bertrand W.H. Dyer, Major Frederick H. Abbot and Major William Parham, primarily assisted by Colombian lawyers Rafael Escallón, Timoleón Moncada, Carlos Losano Losano, Jorge and Enrique Gutiérrez Anzola.

By Decree 0446 of February 14, 1950 the National Police created the Gonzálo Jiménez de Quesada Non-Commissioned School to train mid-level enlisted staff under the management of the General Santander National Police Academy.

Military Dictator, Gustavo Rojas Pinilla
On June 13, 1953 Lieutenant General Gustavo Rojas Pinilla seized power in a coup d'etat, assuming functions as President of Colombia. In an attempt to better organize the military forces, President Rojas declared the Decree 1814 on the same day officially renaming and revamping the General Command of the Military Forces of Colombia under the name of General Command of the Armed Forces of Colombia. It defined the conformation of the Armed Forces as comprising the Army, Navy, Air Force and the National Police, the last assigned to the Ministry of War once again as a fourth military power, functioning with its own independent budget and organization, separate from the other branches as established by law.

The Ministry of War was later renamed as the Ministry of Defense. Many Police Academies were planned and constructed in other cities of Colombia. In 1953 the Antonio Nariño Police Academy in Barranquilla and the Alejandro Gutiérrez Police Academy in Manizales were opened, followed by a social plan for retirement and social security called Caja de Sueldos de la Policia Nacional by Decree 417 of 1954. The Eduardo Cuevas Academy later opened in 1955 in the city of Villavicencio and the Carlos Holguín Academy in Medellín was opened in 1958. During this year a cooperation mission arrived from Chile to reorganize and train the Carabinier Corps in urban and rural surveillance.

As established in Law 193 of December 30, 1959, the Colombian nation assumed full financial responsibility for the National Police.

Colombian Armed Conflict

In 1964, as mandated by the Decree 349 of February 19, the Police Superior Academy was founded to indoctrinate officers with the rank of Major to the grade of Lieutenant Colonels. By 1977 the institution had created the first course for female officers.

During the 1960s and 1970s the National Police started facing guerrilla threats which were emerging during these years as a backlash from the political bipartisan struggle of the La Violencia years. There was also the growing problem of contraband and illegal drug trafficking and the involvement of the United States with the implementation of the Plan LASO as a proxy war plan against the expansion of Communism during the Cold War.

Later, the declaration of the War on Drugs and the Plan Colombia would eventually help develop the present and ongoing Colombian Armed Conflict involving mainly guerrillas: the FARC-EP including its Patriotic Union Party, ELN, EPL, M-19, among many others; the Drug Cartels such as the Medellín Cartel, Cali Cartel, and others; paramilitarism and the AUC. The Colombian National Police have been fighting against these many threats, tainted or involved in some cases of corruption and accusations of human rights violations, amid the efforts of the majority of the institution to change its image.

Late 1990s improvement drive

During successive weak presidencies, some Colombian National Police members were accused of being involved in many corruption cases, including guerrilla collaboration; paramilitarism and the cleansing of the leftist Patriotic Union Party, among other cases; and the corruption generated by the drug cartels' illegal money or other criminal activities.  The CNP became untrusted by the general population of Colombia and the country was facing an intense conflict or a full scale civil war.

To prevent this situation the institution began a process of change focusing on reinvigorating the values and principles of the institution, mostly led by General Rosso Jose Serrano. Colombia's problems were demanding a strong government with strong institutions to face the numerous violations to the constitution and the population in general. The first steps towards this path was the relegation of bad policemen inside the force and targeting the major criminal organizations. The institution also focused on providing better benefits for the policemen and their families; and a particular effort to restore the trust of the community for the police force, emphasizing preventing crime, educating the population and the policemen on cordial relationships, neighborhood watch, cooperation, and community development.

Since 1995 the National Police has begun to change norms, structures, and standard operating procedures, essentially on policemen's judgment toward accomplishing missions and encouraging those who are willing to work with selfless service, integrity, leadership, and a vision of improving the population in general.

The National Police continues to have some corruption and human rights problems but the improvement has been considerable, including the education of personnel in other countries' law enforcement institutions and educational institutions through cooperation agreements. The institution is also highly involved in the Plan Colombia.

2007 Wiretapping Scandal
In May 2007, Revista Semana released transcripts of illegal wiretaps of incarcerated paramilitary leaders. After admitting his knowledge of the taps, commanding general Jorge Daniel Castro was asked to resign, along with General Guillermo Chavez Ocana, the intelligence chief. General Oscar Naranjo Trujillo, a relatively junior general, was named to replace Castro. Due to police rules, Naranjo's appointment required the additional retirement of 10 senior generals.

Ranks

Officers

The Officer Corps of the Colombian National Police forms the commanding level of the institution, starting with the rank of sub-lieutenant, and ascending through lieutenant, captain, major, lieutenant colonel, colonel, brigadier general, major general, lieutenant general to the final and top grade of general. This branch is in charge of the administrative area of the institution and its public relations.

Rank Badges

Executives

The executive branch is formed by chief officers of the Colombian National Police, who are commissioned to political appointee duties, and may or may not actually be professional police officers. In these circumstances, there is often a professional chief of police in charge of day-to-day operations.

Rank Badges

Enlisted

This branch of the Colombian National Police is in charge of executing operations and functions under the command of the officers.

Auxiliary Police
 Auxiliar de Policía : Auxiliary Police: Military conscripts serving their compulsory military service in the National Police for (18) eighteen months, performing any other activities as a professional member of the institution. They use small arms, side-handle batons (Tonfa), and in areas of public policing or are guards of the police station, using long range weapons (rifles).
 Auxiliar de Policía Bachiller: Auxiliary Police Bachelor: Provides his compulsory military service in the National Police for (12) twelve months performing community activities, such as regulating traffic and other primary activities of police. Does not use firearms.

Organization
The National Police is an armed police service that is civilian in nature, with a hierarchical structure, similar to that of the Military Forces of Colombia. The CNP is headed by the General of the National Police, who is appointed by the President of the Republic, and must be a General officer of the institution.

Because their jurisdiction is national, the police distributed in its coverage: (8) Regional Police, (5) Metropolitan Police and (34) Police Departments, including the region of Uraba.

The Directorate General (DIPON), is divided into six directorates support services (administrative), eight operational direction, a direction of educational counselors and five offices:

 Operational Level:
 Dirección de Seguridad Ciudadana (DISEC) - Directorate for Citizens Security (DISEC)
 Dirección de Carabineros y Seguridad - Directorate of Carabiners and Rural Security
 Dirección de Investigación Criminal e Interpol (DICIL) - Directorate of Criminal Investigation and Interpol 
 Dirección de Inteligencia Policial (DIPOL) - Police Intelligence Directorate (DIPOL)
 Dirección de Antinarcóticos (DIRAN) - Anti-Narcotics Directorate (DIRAN)
 Dirección de Protección y Servicios Especiales (DIPRO) - Directorate for Protection and Special Services (DIPRO)
 Dirección Antisecuestro y Antiextorsión - Directorate for Anti-kidnapping and Anti Extortion
 Dirección de Tránsito y Transporte - Directorate of Traffic and Transportation
 Administrative level:
 Dirección Administrativa y Financiera (DIRAF) - Directorate for Administration and Finance
 Dirección de Talento Humano (DITAH) - Directorate of Human Capability
 Dirección de Sanidad (DISAN) - Directorate of Health
 Dirección de Bienestar Social (DIBIE) - Directorate of Social Welfare
 Dirección de Incorporación (DINCO) - Directorate of Incorporation
 Advisory offices:
 Inspección General (INSGE) - Inspector General
 Oficina de Planeación (OFPLA) - Planning Office
 Secretaria General (SEGEN) - Secretary General
 Oficina de Telemática (OFITE) - Office of TeleCommunications
 Oficina de Comunicaciones Estratégicas (COEST) - Office of Strategic Communications

Special Groups

The following Grupos especiales or Special Groups exist within the CNP:

 (COPES) Comando de Operaciones Especiales (Commando group)
 (GOES) Grupo de Operaciones Especiales (SWAT)
 (CORAM) Comando de Reacción Motorizada (Motorized reaction group)
 (JUNGLA) Comandos Jungla Antinarcóticos (counter narcotics)
 (CEAT) Cuerpo Especial Antiterrorista (Anti and counter terror)
 (EMCAR) Escuadrón Móvil de Carabineros (Rural vigilance)
 (ESMAD) Escuadrón Móvil Antidisturbios (Riot police)
 (GRATE) Grupo Antiterrorista (Anti terror)
 (BLAUR) Grupo Bloque Antiterrorista Urbano (Urban Anti Terror)
 (UNIR) Unidad de Intervención y Reacción (Quick reaction force)
 (FUCUR) Fuerza de Control Urbano (urban control)
 (GAULA) Grupos de Acción Unificada por la Libertad personal (Unified Action Group for Liberty) (Counter kidnap, counter extortion, and hostage rescue)

Regional organization
 Police Regions
 Región de Policía No. 1 - Police Region 1 headquartered in Bogota
 Región de Policía No. 2 - Police Region 2 headquartered in Neiva
 Región de Policía No. 3 - Police Region 3 headquartered in Pereira
 Región de Policía No. 4 - Police Region 4 headquartered in Cali
 Región de Policía No. 5 - Police Region 5 headquartered in Cucuta
 Región de Policía No. 6 - Police Region 6 headquartered in Medellin
 Región de Policía No. 7 - Police Region 7 headquartered in Villavicencio
 Región de Policía No. 8 - Police Region 8 headquartered in Barranquilla

 Policía Metropolitana - Metropolitan Police - There are 17 metropolitan police commands in Bogota, Tunja, Medellin, Cali, Barranquilla, Cartagena, Cucuta, Pereira, Bucaramanga, Santa Marta, Valle de Aburrá, Pereira, Ibagué, Neiva, Villavicencio, Pasto and Popayán. These are led by either Colonels or Brigadier Generals.
 Departamento de Policía  -  Departmental Police - Each of the 32 departments of Colombia have a full Departmental Police Command with a Colonel as Commanding officer, with Uraba and Magdalena Medio having their own departmental police commands bringing the total number to 34.

Both are subdivided as follows:
 Comando Operativo de Seguridad Ciudadana - Operational command of Public Safety
 Distrito de Policía - Police District
 Estación de Policía - Police Station
 Subestación de Policía  - Police Substation
 Comandos de Atención Inmediata – CAI -  immediate attention Commands
 Puesto de Policía - Police Posts

Schools

The Colombian National Police has 18 different educational facilities throughout Colombia.

General Santander Academy

The General Santander National Police Academy is the main educational center for the Colombian National Police. The academy functions as a university for the formation of its force, focusing primarily on officers. It is located in Bogotá.

National Police NCO School "Gonzalo Jimenez de Quesada" 
Based in Sibaté, Cundinamarca Department, the National Police NCO School trains all active non-commissioned personnel of the National Police in the police sciences, basic police training and proper methods in policing.

National Carabinier School "Alfonso Lopez Pumarejo" 
The National Carabinier School with its campus in Facatativá in Cundinamarca trains the Colombian Carabiniers, the mounted and rural branch of the National Police dedicated towards keeping law and order in the nation's rural communities, and one of its oldest components, having been set up in 1846, 45 years before the advent of the National Police.

National Police Staff College 
Stationed in Bogota, the national capital city, this institution trains all senior grade officers of the National Police in preparation for them to receive more higher responsibilities.

Bogota Metropolitan Police Academy "Lieutenant Colonel Julián Ernesto Guevara Castro" 
The Bogota Metropolitan Police Academy trains all officers, executive staff and policemen for service in the capital city.

Sumapaz Provincial Police Academy 
With campus in Fusagasugá, Sumapaz Province, Cundinamarca, it is one of the foremost departamental police academies of the National Police, training men and women in public security and police skills in the province and throughout the Greater Bogota area.

Antonio Nariño Police Academy 
Stationed in Soledad, Atlántico, this police academy trains future non-commissioned police agents and executive staff in service in the Greater Barranquilla area.

National Police Air Training School 
Located in the municipality of Mariquita, Tolima, it trains police agents, executive service staff, and officers for service in the Police Air Service.

National Police School of Criminal Investigation and Detection 
Based in Bogota it is the primary center for the education of police personnel in the processes of criminal investigation.

Equipment

Transport

 Armed speedboats.
 Transport trucks.
 Armored vehicles.
 Buffalo riot control vehicles
 Pick-Up Trucks for rural transport.
 Toyota Prado and Nissan Patrol Trucks for patrol.
 Vans to transport prisoners and metropolitan work.
 Buses to transport prisoners 
 Chevrolet Optra work for metropolitan and prosecution.
 High-powered motorcycles.

Personal weapons
Grenade launchers:
 Mk 19 grenade launcher
 M79 Grenade Launcher
 Milkor MGL

Machine Guns:

 IMI Negev
 GAU-17
 M240 machine gun
 M249 SAW
 M60 Machine gun
 GAU-19
 M1919 Browning machine gun
 M2 Browning
 Heckler & Koch HK21
 Ultimax 100
 FN MAG
 MG 42
 Vektor SS-77

Rifles:

 M4 carbine
 M16 rifle variants M16A2, M16A3
 IMI Galil variants AR, SAR, ARM
 Galil ACE
 IMI Tavor TAR-21

Submachine guns:

 Uzi
 Walther MP
 HK MP5
 TDI Vector
 Micro Tavor

Handguns:

 Colt M1911
 Jericho 941
 CZ 45
 SIG Sauer P228 (M11)
 SIG Sauer Pro variants 2009 and 2022
 SIG Sauer P226
 CZ 75variant BD
 Smith & Wesson 459
 Uberti Revolvers

Aircraft inventory

Servicio Aéreo de Policia (SAPOL) operates 39 fixed wing aircraft and 65 helicópters

Fixed-wing
 Air Tractor AT-802
 ATR 42
 Ayres S2R-T45 Turbo Thrush
 Basler BT-67 (produced by Basler Turbo Conversions basically a retrofitted Douglas DC-3 airframe.)
 Cessna TU206G Stationair
 Beechcraft 1900D
 Beechcraft B300 King Air
 Beechcraft 200 Super King Air
 Beechcraft C99
 Bombardier Dash 8-300
 Cessna 208B Grand Caravan
 Cessna 152
 de Havilland Canada DHC-6-300 Twin Otter 
 Fairchild SA227-AC Metro III
 Fairchild C-26

Helicopters
 MD Helicopters MD-530F Lifter and MD-500D
 Bell OH-58s  and Bell 206B Ranger, Bell 206L Longranger
 Bell UH-1Hs, Bell 212, Bell 412
 Sikorsky UH-60 Black Hawk
Bell 407/407 GX
Bell Huey II

Historic Civil Guards now abolished
Civil Guard (Colombia), created in 1902

See also 
 Crime in Colombia
 Cuerpo Técnico de Investigación
 Colombia Migration

References

External links

 
 

 
Ministry of National Defense (Colombia)
National law enforcement agencies of Colombia
1891 establishments in Colombia
Government agencies established in 1891
Colombia